Southwell Minster is a minster and cathedral in Southwell, Nottinghamshire, England. It is the seat of the Bishop of Southwell and Nottingham and the Diocese of Southwell and Nottingham. It is a grade I listed building.

History

Middle Ages
The earliest church on the site is believed to have been founded in 627 by Paulinus, the first Archbishop of York, when he visited the area while baptising believers in the River Trent. The legend is commemorated in the Minster's baptistry window.

In 956 King Eadwig gave land in Southwell to Oskytel, Archbishop of York, on which a minster church was established. The Domesday Book of 1086 recorded the Southwell manor in great detail. The Norman reconstruction of the church began in 1108, probably as a rebuilding of the Anglo-Saxon church, starting at the east end so that the high altar could be used as soon as possible and the Saxon building was dismantled as work progressed. Many stones from this earlier Anglo-Saxon church were reused in the construction. The tessellated floor and late 11th century tympanum in the north transept are the only parts of the Anglo-Saxon building remaining intact. Work on the nave began after 1120 and the church was completed by c.1150.

The church was originally attached to the Archbishop of York's Palace which stood next door and is now ruined. It served the archbishop as a place of worship and was a collegiate body of theological learning, hence its designation as a minster. The minster draws its choir from the nearby school with which it is associated.

The Norman chancel was square-ended. For a plan of the original church see Clapham (1936). The chancel was replaced with another in the Early English style in 1234–51 because it was too small. The octagonal chapter house, built starting in 1288 with a vault in the Decorated Gothic style has naturalistic carvings of foliage (the 13th-century stonecarving includes several Green Men). The elaborately carved "pulpitum" or choir screen was built in 1320–40.

Reformation and civil war
The church suffered less than many others in the English Reformation as it was refounded in 1543 by Act of Parliament.

Southwell is where Charles I surrendered to Scottish Presbyterian troops in 1646 during the English Civil War, after the third siege of Newark. The fighting saw the church seriously damaged and the nave is said to have been used as stabling. The adjoining palace was almost completely destroyed, first by Scottish troops and then by the local people, with only the Hall of the Archbishop remaining as a ruined shell.

18th century
On 5 November 1711 the southwest spire was struck by lightning, and the resulting fire spread to the nave, crossing and tower destroying roofs, bells, clock and organ. By 1720 repairs had been completed, now giving a flat panelled ceiling to the nave and transepts.

Victorian
In 1805 Archdeacon Kaye gave the Minster the Newstead lectern; once owned by Newstead Abbey, it had been thrown into the abbey fishpond by the monks to save it during the Dissolution of the Monasteries, then later discovered when the lake was dredged. Henry Gally Knight in 1818 gave the Minster four panels of 16th century Flemish glass (which now fill the bottom part of the East window) which he had acquired from a Parisian pawnshop.

In danger of collapse, the spires were removed in 1805 and re-erected in 1879–81 when the minster was extensively restored by Ewan Christian, an architect specialising in churches. The nave roof was replaced with a pitched roof and the quire was redesigned and refitted.

Ecclesiastical history

Collegiate church
Southwell Minster was served by prebendaries from the early days of its foundation. By 1291 there were 16 Prebends of Southwell mentioned in the Taxation Roll.

In August 1540, as the dissolution of the monasteries was coming to an end, and despite its collegiate rather than monastic status, Southwell Minster was suppressed specifically in order that it could be included in the plans initiated by King Henry VIII to create several new cathedrals. It appears to have been proposed as the see for a new diocese comprising Nottinghamshire and Derbyshire, as a replacement for Welbeck Abbey which had been dissolved in 1538 and which by 1540 was no longer owned by the Crown.

The plan for the minster's elevation did not proceed, so in 1543 Parliament reconstituted its collegiate status as before. In 1548 it again lost its collegiate status under the 1547 Act of King Edward VI which suppressed (among others) almost all collegiate churches: at Southwell the prebendaries were given pensions and the estates sold, while the church continued as the parish church on the petitions of the parishioners.

By an Act of Philip and Mary in 1557, the minster and its prebends were restored. In 1579 a set of statutes was promulgated by Queen Elizabeth I and the chapter operated under this constitution until it was dissolved in 1841. The Ecclesiastical Commissioners made provision for the abolition of the chapter as a whole; the death of each canon after this time resulted in the extinction of his prebend. The chapter came to its appointed end on 12 February 1873 with the death of Thomas Henry Shepherd, rector of Clayworth and prebendary of Beckingham.

Cathedral
Despite the August 1540 plans to make Southwell Minster a cathedral not initially coming to fruition at the time, in 1884, 344 years later, Southwell Minster became a cathedral proper for Nottinghamshire and a part of Derbyshire including the city of Derby. The diocese was divided in 1927 and the Diocese of Derby was formed. The diocese's centenary was commemorated by a royal visit to distribute Maundy money. George Ridding, the first Bishop of Southwell, designed and paid for the grant of Arms now used as the diocesan coat of arms.

Architecture

The nave, transepts, central tower and two western towers of the Norman church which replaced the Saxon minster remain as an outstanding achievement of severe Romanesque design. With the exception of fragments mentioned above, they are the oldest part of the existing church.

The nave is of seven bays, plus a separated western bay. The columns of the arcade are short and circular, with small scalloped capitals. The triforium has a single large arch in each bay. The clerestory has small round-headed windows. The external window openings are circular. There is a tunnel-vaulted passage between the inside and outside window openings of the clerestory. The nave aisles are vaulted, the main roof of the nave is a trussed rafter roof, with tie-beams between each bay – a late 19th century replacement.

By contrast with the nave arcade, the arches of the crossing are tall, rising to nearly the full height of the nave walls. The capitals of the east crossing piers depict scenes from the life of Jesus. Two stages of the inside of the central tower can be seen at the crossing, with cable and wave decoration on the lower order and zigzag on the upper. The transepts have three stories with semi-circular arches, like the nave, but without aisles.

The western facade has pyramidal spires on its towers – a unique feature today, though common in the 12th century. The existing spires date only from 1880, but they replace those destroyed by fire in 1711, which are documented in old illustrations. The large west window dates from the 15th century. The central tower's two ornamental stages place it high among England's surviving Norman towers. The lower order has intersecting arches, the upper order plain arches. The north porch has a tunnel vault, and is decorated with intersecting arches.

The choir is Early English in style, and was completed in 1241. It has transepts, thus separating the choir into a western and eastern arm. The choir is of two storeys, with no gallery or triforium. The lower storey has clustered columns with multiform pointed arches, the upper storey has twin lancet arches in each bay. The rib vault of the choir springs from clustered shafts which rest on corbels. The vault has ridge ribs. The square east end of the choir has two stories each of four lancet windows.

In the 14th century the chapter house and the choir screen were added. The chapter house, started in 1288, is in an early decorated style, octagonal, with no central pier. It is reached from the choir by a passage and vestibule, through an entrance portal. This portal has five orders, and is divided by a central shaft into two subsidiary arches with a circle with quatrefoil above. Inside the chapter house, the stalls fill the octagonal wall sections, each separated by a single shaft with a triangular canopy above. The windows are of three lights, above them two circles with trefoils and above that a single circle with quatrefoil. This straightforward description gives no indication of the glorious impression, noted by so many writers, of the elegant proportions of the space, and of the profusion (in vestibule and passage, not just in the chapter house) of exquisitely carved capitals and tympana, mostly representing leaves in a highly naturalistic and detailed representation. The capitals in particular are deeply undercut, adding to the feeling of realism. Individual plant species such as ivy, maple, oak, hop, hawthorn can often be identified. The botanist Albert Seward published a detailed description of the carvings and their identification in 1935 and Nikolaus Pevsner wrote the classic description entitled The Leaves of Southwell, with photographs by Frederick Attenborough, in 1945.

The rood screen dates from 1320 to 1340, and is an outstanding example of the Decorated style. It has an east and west facade, separated by a vaulted space with flying ribs. The east facade, of two storeys, is particularly richly decorated, with niches on the lower storey with ogee arches, and openwork gables on the upper storey. The central archway rises higher than the lower storey, with an ogee arch surmounted by a cusped gable.

The finest memorial in the minster is the alabaster tomb of Edwin Sandys, Archbishop of York (died 1588).

Staff

Dean and chapter
:
Dean — Nicola Sullivan (since 17 September 2016 installation)
Canon Chancellor – position vacant
Canon Precentor – Richard Frith (since 8 September 2019)
Canon Missioner – Paul Rattigan (since 22 January 2022)

Other clergy
Priest Vicar and Canon Theologian (honorary canon) — Alison Milbank
Priest Vicar – David McCollough
Priest Vicar – Erika Kirk

Lay staff

Rector Chori – Paul Provost
Assistant Director of Music – Jonathan Allsopp
Organ Scholar – Michael D'Avanzo
Acting Head Verger – Michael Tawn

Music and liturgy

Choirs
The Cathedral Choir

The Cathedral Choir comprises the boy choristers, girl choristers, and lay clerks who, between them, provide music for seven choral services each week during school terms. The boys and girl choristers usually sing as separate groups, combining for particularly important occasions such as Christmas and Easter services, and notable events in the life of the minster. Regular concerts and international tours are a feature of the choir’s work.

Services have been sung in Southwell Minster for centuries, and the tradition of daily choral worship continues to thrive. There was originally a college of vicars choral who took the lead as singers, one or two of whom were known as rector chori, or 'ruler of the choir'. The vicars choral lived in accommodation where Vicars Court now stands, and lived a collegiate lifestyle.

The current Cathedral Choir owes its form to the addition of boy choristers to the vicars choral, and the vicars themselves eventually being replaced by lay singers, known as lay clerks. For a large period of time, the format remained very similar – a number of boy choristers singing with a mixture of lay clerks and vicars choral, slowly becoming a group of entirely lay singers. Eventually, in 2005, a girls’ choir was started by the Assistant Director of Music, who have now been formally admitted as girl choristers.

All of the choristers are educated at the Minster School, a Church of England academy with a music-specialist Junior Department (years 3–6) for choristers and other talented young musicians.

The Cathedral Choir has an enviable reputation for excellence, and has recorded and broadcast extensively over the years. Regular concerts and international tours are a feature of the choir’s work, alongside more local events such as civic services and the annual Four Choirs’ Evensong together with the cathedral choirs of Derby, Leicester and Coventry.

The Cathedral Choir can be heard singing at evensongs at 5.30 pm every weekday (except Wednesday), and on Saturdays and Sundays. 

The Minster Chorale

Southwell Minster Chorale is Southwell Minster’s auditioned adult voluntary choir, and is directed by the Minster’s Assistant Director of Music, Jonathan Allsopp. Founded in 1994, the Chorale’s purpose is to regularly sing for services, especially at times when the Cathedral Choir is not available. In particular, the Chorale sings for:

– Evening Sung Eucharists (All Souls, Epiphany, Ash Wednesday etc.)

– A full Sunday during each half term

– The Fourth Sunday of Advent, and the Fifth Sunday of Lent

– Midnight Mass on Christmas Eve

– The Chorale also sings regularly for the monthly Sunday Mattins.

In addition to its regular round of services, one of the highlights of the Chorale's year is its annual performance of Handel's Messiah in the run-up to Christmas; this concert is a staple of the Minster's Christmas programme, and is always packed out.

The Chorale also regularly goes on tour; in recent years they have toured to the Channel Islands and the Scilly Isles. A 2020 tour to Schwerin, Germany was planned (together with Lincoln Cathedral Consort), but this was cancelled due to the Coronavirus pandemic. The Chorale also visits other cathedrals to sing services, and recently has been to York Minster.

Southwell Minster Chorale rehearses weekly during term-time on a Friday from 7:45 pm – 9:15 pm. The Chorale also enjoys a good social life, with regular trips to the pub after rehearsals and for Sunday lunches.

List of rectores chori

 Lawrence Pepys 1499
 George Vincent 1519
 George Thetford 1568
 John Mudd 1582
 Thomas Foster 1584
 William Colbecke 1586
 John Beeston 1594
 Edward Manestie 1596
 Francis Dogson 1622
 John Hutchinson 1628
 Edward Chappell 1661
 George Chappell 1690
 William Popeley 1699
 William Lee 1718–1754
 Samuel Wise 1754–1755
 Edmund Ayrton 1755–1764
 Thomas Spofforth 1764–1818
 Edward Heathcote 1818–1835
 Frederick Gunton 1835–1841
 Chappell Batchelor 1841–1857
 Herbert Stephen Irons 1857–1872
 Cedric Bucknall 1872–1876
 William Weaver Ringrose 1876–1879
 W Arthur Marriott 1879–1888
 Robert William Liddle 1888–1918
 Harry William Tupper 1918–1929
 George Thomas Francis 1929–1946
 Robert James Ashfield 1946–1956
 David James Lumsden 1956–1959
 Kenneth Bernard Beard 1959–1989
 Paul Robert Hale 1989–2016
 Paul Provost Apr 2017–

To see the list of organists, assistant directors of music and organ scholars, see the list of musicians at English cathedrals.

Southwell Music Festival 
The minster is also home to the annual Southwell Music Festival, held in late August.

Image gallery

Ground plans of the minster

Exterior

Nave and transepts

Choir

Chapter House

Windows

Old illustrations

See also
 Architecture of the medieval cathedrals of England
 List of Gothic Cathedrals in Europe
 English Gothic architecture
 Romanesque architecture
 Church of England
 Southwell Preparatory School a private Anglican primary and intermediate school in Hamilton, New Zealand named after the town and cathedral.

References

External links

Southwell Minster Virtual Tour
Southwell Minster website
Details and pictures of the screen organ from the National Pipe Organ Register
Details of the nave organ from the National Pipe Organ Register
A case study on Southwell Minster from the University of Virginia, with plans and digital models

13th-century church buildings in England
English churches with Norman architecture
English Gothic architecture in Nottinghamshire
Anglican cathedrals in England
Grade I listed churches in Nottinghamshire
Grade I listed cathedrals
Church of England church buildings in Nottinghamshire
Churches completed in 1300
10th-century establishments in England
Southwell, Nottinghamshire
Diocese of Southwell and Nottingham
Ewan Christian buildings
Religious buildings and structures completed in 956
10th-century church buildings in England